Västerås is a city in central Sweden on the shore of Lake Mälaren in the province of Västmanland,  west of Stockholm. The city had a population of 127,799 at the end of 2019, out of the municipal total of 154,049.
Västerås is the seat of Västerås Municipality, the capital of Västmanland County and an episcopal see.

History

Västerås is one of the oldest cities in Sweden and Northern Europe. The name originates from Västra Aros (West Aros), which refers to the river mouth of Svartån. The area has been populated since the Nordic Viking Age, before 1000 CE. In the beginning of the 11th century it was the second largest city in Sweden, and by the 12th century had become the seat of the bishop.
Anundshög is located just outside the City of Västerås. Anundshög is Sweden's largest burial mound. "Hög" is derived from the Old Norse word haugr meaning mound or barrow.

In the ensuing centuries, a cathedral and a monastery were built; the Gothic cathedral, rebuilt by Birger Jarl on an earlier site, and consecrated in 1271, was restored in the 19th century.  The first City Arms date from the end of the 13th century. A castle commands the town from an eminence; it was captured by King Gustav I and rebuilt by him, and Eric XIV was confined there from 1573 to 1575. Gustav also called together the riksdag in Västerås. During the riksdag assembly, the decision was made to convert Sweden into a Protestant state and to remove the power of the Catholic Church.
Rudbeckianska gymnasiet, the oldest gymnasium (secondary school) in Sweden, was built in Västerås by Johannes Rudbeckius in 1623.
In the 18th and 19th centuries, the growing of cucumber became popular, and Västerås received the nickname Gurkstaden (the Cucumber City), which it still retains today.

Today 

Västerås is predominantly known as an industrial city, but also a retailing and logistics city. The city wants to distinguish itself as Västerås – Mälarstaden, meaning "Västerås—the city by Lake Mälaren", in order to attract tourists and new inhabitants, as well as students to the local university college, Mälardalen University (approximately 16,000 enrolled students in Västerås and in the nearby Eskilstuna). To this effect, the city has started using a designed logo as branding in some official contexts, partially replacing the coat of arms, as well as rebuilding several old harbor areas to make them more attractive to live in. Västerås has the largest lakeside commercial and recreational port in Scandinavia on Lake Mälaren. The lake has many islands, and there are tourist boats that go out to them daily in the summer.
The city also has a skyscraper colloquially nicknamed "Skrapan" which has Sweden's highest-located cocktail bar, called Sky Bar, on the 24th floor of the building. Until 2017, Västerås hosted Power Big Meet, an annual event for owners and enthusiasts of classic American cars. The event moved to Lidköping in 2017, with arrangers citing having outgrown the available facilities in Västerås. Long-time Power Big meet collaborator Klas Brink instead arranged the competing Västerås Summer Meet at the same location as Power Big Meet had been arranged for years.

Climate
According to the Köppen climate classification, Västerås experiences a humid continental climate bordering, according to the original  isotherm, an oceanic climate (Dfb/Cfb) with cold winters and warm summers.
Summers tend to be quite unpredictable with sunny spells but with a risk of sudden showers. The sunniest weather usually occurs when high-pressure systems are blocking the low-pressure systems that usually move in from the Atlantic Ocean.
Winters are usually cold with a snow cover that lasts for several months. Some winters can be mild with longer spells without snow on the ground. The weather differs a lot whether the air masses are coming from the Atlantic Ocean or from the Eurasian continent. In the first case, temperatures over  might be expected. In the second case, the temperature may not rise above  in the middle of the day. Lake Mälaren is usually frozen from December until the end of March.

The Åkesta observatory stands 4km to the north of the town, in Åkesta.

Demographics

Economy

Industry 

In 1891, the Turbine House, a small hydroelectric dam was built on Svartån, in central Västerås.  This early electrification encouraged ASEA, a large electricity equipment manufacturer, to concentrate its operations in Västerås, shifting focus away from Arboga. After the 1988 merger with the power systems company Brown, Boveri & Cie, ASEA became ABB Group. As a result, Västerås is home to its ABB AB Swedish subsidiary headquarters. ABB in Västerås produces e.g. robots and drive systems for the industry, high-voltage direct current transmission and power grids.

A number of business units have been spun out of ABB. Principal among them is Hitachi Energy (Hitachi).
Since the Westinghouse takeover of ABB's nuclear business it is owned by Westinghouse Electric Company. It is situated mainly in Finnslätten, an industrial area in the northern part of Västerås. Westinghouse Sweden produces nuclear fuel and offers nuclear services for Boiling Water Reactors and Pressurized water reactors. , Westinghouse Sweden had more than 1000 employees. The plant has provided fuel for Ukraine since 2005. On 11 April 2014, after the Russian annexation of Crimea, the contract with Energoatom for the South Ukraine Nuclear Power Plant was extended through 2020.

Mälarenergi AB is a city-owned district heating and electric power provider for Västerås and surrounding area. Mälarenergi owns and operates a number of plants of which the biggest one is the heat and power plant in Västerås. It is Sweden's largest combined heat and power plant, and the latest unit (number 6) uses waste as fuel.
Other major industries include Bombardier Transportation, which is active in railway business with production of propulsion systems for trains with worldwide customers, GE Power Sweden, Enics , Quintus Technologies AB (high pressure metal working and material densification equipment for the manufacturing industry) and Northvolt AB which designs, develops and manufactures lithium-ion battery cells and complete battery systems for electric vehicles, heavy transport, mining, and energy industries, as well as portable devices.

Retailing and trade 
One of the historical reasons that made Västerås a city is its trading-friendly location by the river Svartån and lake Mälaren. The city remains one of the main logistical centers in Sweden due to its central location in the densely populated region Mälardalen and favourable infrastructure connections with railways, waterways and highways. Amongst others, ICA AB has one of its main distribution centres located in Västerås.
Västerås is the birthplace of multinational clothing retailer H&M. Their first store was opened in the town centre in 1947.
Erikslund Shopping Center, on the outskirts of Västerås, was Sweden's biggest mall until Mall of Scandinavia opened in 2015, and the retail park is the third biggest in sales after Kungens Kurva and Barkarby.

Sports 

 De grönvita (The Green and White), Västerås SK – Founded on 29 January 1904, "The Green and White" is the most successful bandy team in Sweden, with 22 Swedish Championships won (20 male, 2 female). They have the largest permanent indoor arena for bandy in Sweden, ABB Arena Syd. The Bandy World Championship have been played in Västerås several times.
 VIK Västerås HK, known as VIK Västerås Hockey Klubb. The club had its greatest moment in 1992/1993 when the club won the regular series in the Swedish Elitleague (VIK reached quarter finals in the playoff). In 2000 the club was degraded from the league and faced a financial crisis. The club was declared bankrupt. During the fall of 2000 the club restarted in the lowest division which the team won. Today (2019) they are playing in Hockeyallsvenskan, the second tier. Among hockey players from Västerås you find:  Nicklas Lidström, Tommy Salo, Patrik Berglund, Mikael Backlund and many more.
 Västerås SK, currently plays in the second tier of Swedish football, Superettan. Having mostly been playing in the higher divisions of Swedish football. The last time the club was in the premier division was in 1997.
 IFK Västerås FK, football club in Division 4 Västmanland
 IK Franke, football club in Division 3 Norra Svealand
 Skiljebo SK, football club in Division 2 Norra Svealand
 Västerås IK, football club in Division 4 Norra Svealand
 Syrianska IF Kerburan, football club in Division 3 Norra Svealand
Gideonsbergs IF football club in Division 3 Norra Svealand

Notable natives 

 Ana Diaz, musician
 Axenstar, power metal band
 Bobo Stenson, jazz pianist
 Dagmar Lange, author under the pen name Maria Lang
 Embee, hip hop deejay and producer
 Esbjörn Svensson, jazz pianist
 Fredrik Johansson, musician
 Frida Hansdotter, alpine skier
 Olof Thunberg, actor
 Fronda, rapper
 Gary Sundgren, football player
 Gerda Ahlm, artist
 Jonny Rödlund, football player
 Lars Wallin, fashion designer
 Lars Ekborg, comedian
 Linda Rosing, singer, politician, model
 Loreen, singer
 Magnus Lindgren, jazz musician
 Mai Zetterling, actress and film director
 Maria Bonnevie, actress
 Maria Montazami, television personality
 Markus Oscarsson, Olympic gold medalists in canoeing 2004
 Mattias Andréasson, singer 
 Mikael Backlund, ice hockey player
 Nicklas Lidström, ice hockey player
 Ola Sandström, singer, songwriter and musician
 Pandora, singer
 Patrik Berglund, ice hockey player
 Patrik Isaksson, swimmer
 Pontus Kåmark, football player
 Promoe, rapper 
 Pugh Rogefeldt, musician
 Stefan Pettersson, footballer
 Tomas Tranströmer, poet
 Tommy Salo, ice hockey player
 Victor Lindelöf, footballer
 Joakim "Jocke" Götberg, heavy metal musician and singer
 Åsa Svensson, tennis player

Travel
 Stockholm-Västerås Airport
 Västerås Central Station

See also 
 2009 Bandy World Championship
 Power Big Meet

References

External links 

 
 Local portal for Västerås, articles, pictures etc
 Westeraas, Ancient See of – Article in the Catholic Encyclopedia
 Pictures from Anundshög, Västerås, Sweden; www.remains.se 

 
County seats in Sweden
Municipal seats of Västmanland County
Populated lakeshore places in Sweden
Populated places in Västmanland County
Populated places in Västerås Municipality
Swedish municipal seats
Cities in Västmanland County